The 1939 Texas Longhorns football team represented the University of Texas at Austin in the 1939 college football season. The Longhorns were coached by Dana X. Bible in his third season and played as a member of the Southwest Conference (SWC). They finished the season with an overall record of five wins and four losses (5–4, 3–3 SWC).

Schedule

References

Texas
Texas Longhorns football seasons
Texas Longhorns football